Suraneh (also Romanized as Sūrāneh; also known as Sīrān and Sirna) is a village in Qarah Kahriz Rural District, Qarah Kahriz District, Shazand County, Markazi Province, Iran. At the 2006 census, its population was 786, in 212 families.

References 

Populated places in Shazand County